"Get Dancin'" is a song written by Bob Crewe and Kenny Nolan and performed by Disco-Tex and the Sex-O-Lettes, led by Monti Rock III. The song was produced by Bob Crewe and arranged by Bruce Miller. The song was featured on their 1975 album, Disco Tex & His Sex-O-Lettes Review.

It reached #1 on the US Disco chart, #3 on the US Dance chart, #8 on the UK Singles Chart, #8 in Canada, #10 on the Billboard Hot 100, #19 in Australia, and #32 on the US R&B chart in 1974.  The single ranked #100 on Billboard's Year-End Hot 100 singles of 1975.

Monte Rock III, calling himself Disco Tex, tells the audience that despite the troubles in the world, they should dance and enjoy themselves. As the song ends, he thanks the audience for their applause. It appears they want him to do an encore of the song. At first, he protests. "I am tired, I can't, I'm exhausted" he tells the audience, adding that his wig is wet from perspiration. But they continue to chant and he begins the song again.

The single (which is essentially Part 1) lasts 3.20 and fades after the words "My chiffon is wet, darling". The complete version (Parts 1 and 2) lasts 7.15.

Chart history

Weekly charts

Year-end charts

In popular culture
The song is featured on two episodes of The Simpsons, season 2's “Bart vs. Thanksgiving” where Homer listens to a Super Bowl halftime show on the radio where the song is covered by Hooray for Everything (a parody of Up With People) and season 12's "I'm Going to Praiseland", where it plays in Disco Stu's fantasy Heaven.

Other versions
Van McCoy and The Soul City Symphony released a version of the song in 1975 as the B-side to the UK release of "The Hustle".  It was featured on their 1975 album, Disco Baby.
Sandy Nelson released a version of the song as the B-side to the 1975 Australian single "Blue Eyed Soul".

References

External links
 Lyrics of this song
 

1974 songs
1974 debut singles
Songs written by Bob Crewe
Songs written by Kenny Nolan
Disco-Tex and the Sex-O-Lettes songs
Sandy Nelson songs
Song recordings produced by Bob Crewe